Jaromír "Jarda" Paciorek (born 11 July 1979) is a Czech former professional footballer who played as a midfielder.

Career
Paciorek was born in Kroměříž and began his career in a local club, Hanácká Slavia Kroměříž. Soon his talent – including an overview of the game or speed – was detected by coaches of FC Svit Zlín, where Paciorek was later transferred to.

Paciorek played in the Czech under-16 team during 1995 European Under-16 Championship. The championship were successful for him and consequently some famous clubs (e.g. Bayern Munich and Feyenoord Rotterdam) wanted to transfer Paciorek. Eventually Paciorek went to Feyenoord and in his first season he played in the junior team. One year later he was promoted to the senior team, but he did not play any matches there. In 1997, he moved to Excelsior Rotterdam (2nd level). In 1998, he went to Fortuna Sittard, where he played irregularly (31 games over three years) so the club terminated the contract with Paciorek.

In 2001 Paciorek received some offers (among other from Switzerland), but eventually returned to the Czech Republic and signed a contract with 1.FC Brno (1st level). He played only five matches there. At the beginning of 2002–03 season he left the club of his own accord. Then he admitted he has been taking narcotics, commenting it as follows: "give a damn what others think of me".

In 2002, he returned to Hanácká Slavia Kroměříž, but he was not a leading player there. At the beginning of 2006 Paciorek went to Spartak Hulín (Czech Fourth Division), where he played in 36 games. In July 2009 he became a player of the Austrian club SK Eggenburg. In June 2011 he moved to FC Tescoma Zlín but retired in January 2012.

References

1979 births
Living people
People from Kroměříž
Czech footballers
Association football midfielders
FC Fastav Zlín players
Feyenoord players
Excelsior Rotterdam players
Fortuna Sittard players
FC Zbrojovka Brno players
Czech First League players
Eredivisie players
Czech expatriate footballers
Czech expatriate sportspeople in the Netherlands
Expatriate footballers in the Netherlands
Czech expatriate sportspeople in Austria
Expatriate footballers in Austria
Sportspeople from the Zlín Region